= Meldewa =

Indian Village

Meldewa is a village in Uttar Pradesh, India.
